Onorati is a surname of Southern Italian origin. Notable people with the surname include:

Giovanni Antonio Onorati (died 1606), Italian Roman Catholic bishop
Onorato Onorati, Italian Roman Catholic bishop
Nicola Onorati, 18th century Italian priest, writer, and agronomist
Peter Onorati (born 1953), American actor

References

Surnames of Italian origin